Bella Donna is a 1923 American silent film produced by Famous Players-Lasky and released by Paramount Pictures. The film is based on the 1909 novel, Bella Donna, by Robert Smythe Hichens which was later adapted for a 1912 Broadway play starring Alla Nazimova. This film is also a remake of the 1915 Paramount film Bella Donna starring Pauline Frederick. The 1923 film was directed by George Fitzmaurice and starred Pola Negri in her first American film.

Plot
Bella Donna, a seductive woman snares Nigel Armine into marriage and he takes her to Egypt to live. Tired of her simple husband, Bella becomes involved with brutish Baroudi.

Cast
Pola Negri as Bella Donna
Conway Tearle as Mahmoud Baroudi
Conrad Nagel as Nigel Armine
Adolphe Menjou as Mr. Chepstow
Claude King as Doctor Meyer Isaacson
Lois Wilson as Patricia
Antonio Corsi as Fortune Teller
Macey Harlam as Ibrahim
Robert Schable as Doctor Hartley

Song
"Bella Donna (Beautiful Lady)" by Harry B. Smith, Arthur M. Brilant (words) and Ted Snyder.

Phonofilm version
Reportedly the film played with sound provided by the De Forest Phonofilm sound-on-film process. This was probably music and sound effects but no dialogue, and was only at the April 1, 1923 premiere at the Rivoli Theatre in New York City.

Paramount also premiered The Covered Wagon in New York City on March 16, 1923. All or about two reels of The Covered Wagon had a music track recorded in the Phonofilm process, but was only shown this way at the premiere at the Rivoli Theater in New York City. On April 15, 1923, Lee de Forest presented a program of 18 short films made in the Phonofilm process, also at the Rivoli Theater.

Preservation status
A print is reportedly held at the Gosfilmofond Archive in Moscow.

Further reading

References

External links

Progressive Silent Film List: Bella Donna at silentera.com

Bella Donna at Virtual History
Sheet music cover with tie-in to movie poster for Bella Donna

1923 films
American silent feature films
Films based on British novels
Films directed by George Fitzmaurice
Remakes of American films
Famous Players-Lasky films
Transitional sound films
Films set in Egypt
Films set in the 1890s
Films set in the 1900s
American black-and-white films
Films with screenplays by Ouida Bergère
1920s English-language films
1920s American films